The Good Book is a 1971 album released by Melanie and featuring the Top 40 hit "Nickel Song". The album also features "Birthday of the Sun", a track Melanie originally performed at Woodstock in 1969.

The album was the last 'official' Melanie release from Buddah Records - she left the company to form her own label; however several Buddah albums were later issued featuring 'leftover' material from earlier sessions; in addition to several compilation albums.

Track listing
All songs written by Melanie Safka except where noted.

"Good Book"
"Babe Rainbow"
"Sign on the Window" (Bob Dylan)
"The Saddest Thing"
"Nickel Song"
"Isn't It a Pity"
"My Father" (Judy Collins)
"Chords of Fame" (Phil Ochs)
"You Can Go Fishin'"
"Birthday of the Sun"
"The Prize"
"Babe Rainbow (Reprise)"

Personnel
Melanie - nylon guitar, banjo, vocals
Vinnie Bell - electric guitar
Sal DiTroia - classical and steel guitar
Hugh McCracken - classical guitar
Eric Weissberg - fiddle
Joe Mack - bass
Ron Frangipane - keyboards
Margie English - banjo
Buddy Saltzman, George Devens - drums, percussion
Dave Melaney - accordion
George March - woodwind
The Pennywhistlers - backing vocals
John Abbott, Lee Holdridge, Ron Frangipane - arrangements

Charts

References

1971 albums
Melanie (singer) albums
Albums arranged by Lee Holdridge
Buddah Records albums